The Mississauga train derailment occurred on November 10, 1979, in Mississauga, Ontario, Canada, when a CP Rail freight train carrying hazardous chemicals derailed and caught fire. More than 200,000 people were evacuated in the largest peacetime evacuation in North America until Hurricane Katrina. The fire was caused by a failure of the lubricating system. No deaths resulted from the incident.

Causes
A CP Rail freight train, led by three EMD F40PH diesel locomotives loaned from GO Transit, was eastbound from Windsor, Ontario. The train consisted of 106 cars that carried multiple chemicals and explosives, including styrene, toluene, propane, caustic soda, and chlorine. On the 33rd car, heat began to build up in an improperly-lubricated journal bearing on one of the wheels, resulting in the condition known among train workers as a "hot box". (This was one of the few still in use at that time as most had long since been replaced with roller bearings.) Residents living beside the tracks reported smoke and sparks coming from the car, and those who were close to Mississauga thought the train was on fire. The friction eventually burned through the axle and bearing, and as the train was passing the Mavis Road level crossing, near the intersection with Dundas Street, a wheelset (one axle and pair of wheels) fell off completely.

Explosion and evacuation
At 11:53 p.m., at the Mavis Road crossing, the damaged bogie (undercarriage) left the track, causing the remaining parts of the train to derail. The impact caused several tank cars filled with propane to burst into flames.

The derailment also ruptured several other tankers, spilling styrene, toluene, propane, caustic soda, and chlorine onto the tracks and into the air. As the flames were erupting, the train's brakeman, Larry Krupa, 27, at the suggestion of the engineer (also his father-in-law), managed to close an air brake angle spigot at the west end of the undamaged 32nd car, allowing the engineer to release the air brakes between the locomotives and the derailed cars and move the front part of the train eastward along the tracks, away from danger. This prevented those cars from becoming involved in the fire, important as many of them also contained dangerous goods. Krupa was later recommended for the Order of Canada for his bravery, which a later writer has described as "bordering on lunacy."

After more explosions, firefighters concentrated on cooling cars, allowing the fire to burn itself out, but a ruptured chlorine tank became a cause for concern. With the possibility of a deadly cloud of chlorine gas spreading through suburban Mississauga, more than 200,000 people were evacuated. A number of residents (mostly the extreme west and north of Mississauga) allowed evacuees to stay with them until the crisis abated. Some of these people were later moved again as their hosts were also evacuated. The evacuation was managed by various officials including the mayor of Mississauga, Hazel McCallion, the Peel Regional Police and other governmental authorities. McCallion sprained her ankle early during the crisis, but continued to hobble to press conferences.

Aftermath
Within a few days Mississauga was practically deserted, until the contamination had been cleared, the danger neutralized and residents were allowed to return to their homes. The city was finally reopened on the evening of November 16. The chlorine tank was emptied on November 19.

It was the largest peacetime evacuation in North American history until the evacuation of New Orleans due to Hurricane Katrina in 2005, and remained the second-largest until Hurricane Irma in 2017. It was the last major explosion in the Greater Toronto Area until the Sunrise Propane blast in 2008.

Due to the speed and efficiency with which it was conducted, many cities later studied and modelled their own emergency plans after Mississauga's.

As a result of the accident, rail regulators in both the U.S. and Canada required that any line used to carry hazardous materials into or through a populated area have hotbox detectors.
 
Larry Krupa was inducted into the North America Railway Hall of Fame for his contribution to the railway industry. He was recognized in the "National" division of the "Railway Workers & Builders" category.

The city of Mississauga sued CP in hopes of holding the railroad responsible for the massive emergency services bill. However, the city dropped its suit after CP dropped its longstanding opposition to passenger service on its trackage near Mississauga. This cleared the way for GO Transit to open the Milton line two years later.
 
Hazel McCallion, in her first term as mayor at the time of the accident, was continuously re-elected until her retirement in 2014 at age 93.

In popular culture 

The song Trainwreck 1979 by Canadian band Death From Above 1979 is about the derailment:

It ran off the track, 11-79
While the immigrants slept, there wasn't much time
The mayor came calling and got 'em outta bed
They packed up their families and headed upwind
A poison cloud, a flaming sky, 200,000 people and no one died
And all before the pocket dial, yeah!

See also

 List of rail accidents (1970–79)
 List of rail accidents in Canada

References

 
 
 "Miracle of Mississauga", Toronto Sun Publishing, 1979.

History of Mississauga
Explosions in Canada
Explosions in 1979
Gas explosions
Railway accidents in 1979
Train and rapid transit fires
Accidents and incidents involving Canadian Pacific Railway
Mississauga Train Derailment, 1979
Disasters in Ontario
Environmental disasters in Canada
Mississauga Train Derailment, 1979
1979 in the environment
Derailments in Canada
1979 in Ontario
November 1979 events in Canada
Railway accidents and incidents in Ontario